Redbreast may refer to:

 HMS Redbreast, several British Royal Navy ships
 Redbreast-class gunboat, a Royal Navy class of gunboats in commission from 1889 to 1921
 Hull Kingston Rovers, a British rugby league football club
 Redbreast (whiskey), a pure pot still whiskey
 The Redbreast, a crime novel
 Papilio alcmenor, a swallowtail butterfly commonly known as the redbreast

See also
 Redbreast sunfish
 Redbreast tilapia
 Redbreast wrasse
 Robin redbreast (disambiguation)

Animal common name disambiguation pages